The Commission scolaire de la Seigneurie-des-Mille-Îles (CSSMI) is a former francophone school district in the Canadian province of Quebec. It comprises several primary schools and high schools across municipalities in the Laurentides region. The commission is overseen by a board of elected school trustees.

The headquarters are in Saint-Eustache.

The municipalities of Blainville, Boisbriand, Bois-des-Filion, Deux-Montagnes, Lorraine, Oka, Pointe-Calumet, Rosemère, Sainte-Anne-des-Plaines, Sainte-Marthe-sur-le-Lac, Sainte-Thérèse, Saint-Eustache, Saint-Joseph-du-Lac, Saint-Placide, and Terrebonne Ouest are a part of the school district. In addition, the following portions of Mirabel are served by this board: Saint-Augustin, Saint-Benoît, Sainte-Scholastique and a portion of Domaine-Vert.

Schools

Secondary schools

 École secondaire des Érables (Deux-Montagnes)
 École Polyvalente Deux-Montagnes (Deux-Montagnes)
 École Polyvalente Sainte-Thérèse (Sainte-Thérèse)
 École secondaire Saint-Gabriel (Sainte-Thérèse)
 École secondaire des Patriotes (Saint-Eustache)
 École secondaire d'Oka (Oka)
 École secondaire du Harfang (Sainte-Anne-des-Plaines)
 École secondaire Henri-Dunant (Blainville)
 École secondaire Hubert-Maisonneuve (Rosemère)
 École secondaire Jean-Jacques-Rousseau (Boisbriand)
 École secondaire Liberté-Jeunesse (Sainte-Marthe-sur-le-Lac)
 École secondaire Lucille-Teasdale (Blainville)
 École secondaire Rive-Nord (Bois-des-Filion)

Primary schools
 Alpha (Rosemère)
 Arc-en-ciel (Saint-Eustache)
 Arthur-Vaillancourt (Sainte-Thérèse)
 au Coeur-du-Boisé (Saint-Eustache)
 Chante-Bois (Blainville)
 Clair Matin (Saint-Eustache)
 Coeur à coeur, l'Alternative (Saint-Eustache)
 Curé-Paquin (Saint-Eustache)
 de Fontainebleau (Blainville)
 de la Clairière (Boisbriand)
 de la Clé-des-Champs (Mirabel)
 de la Renaissance (Blainville)
 de la Seigneurie (Blainville)
 de l'Amitié (Saint-Placide)
 de l'Aquarelle (Blainville)
 de l'Envolée (Blainville)
 de l'Espace-Couleurs (Terrebonne)
 de l'Harmonie-Jeunesse (Sainte-Anne-des-Plaines)
 des Blés-Dorés (Mirabel)
 des Grands-Chemins (Boisbriand)
 des Grands-Vents (Sainte-Marthe-sur-le-Lac)
 des Lucioles (Sainte-Marthe-sur-le-Lac)
 des Mésanges (Deux-Montagnes)
 des Moissons (Sainte-Anne-des-Plaines)
 des Perséides (Pointe-Calumet)
 des Pins (Oka)
 des Ramilles (Blainville)
 des Semailles (Blainville)
 Du Bois-Joli (Sainte-Anne-des-Plaines)
 du Grand-Pommier (Saint-Joseph-du-Lac)
 du Mai (Boisbriand)
 du Ruisselet (Lorraine)
 du Trait-d'Union (Sainte-Thérèse)
 Emmanuel-Chénard (Deux-Montagnes)
 Gabrielle-Roy (Boisbriand)
 Gaston-Pilon (Boisbriand)
 Girouard (Mirabel)
 Horizon-du-Lac (Sainte-Marthe-sur-le-Lac)
 Horizon-Soleil (Saint-Eustache)
 Jeunes du monde (Terrebonne)
 Le Carrefour (Lorraine)
 Le Roucher (Bois-des-Filion)
 Le Sentier (Boisbriand)
 Le Tandem (Sainte-Thérèse)
 Le Tournesol (Lorraine)
 Marie-Soleil-Tougas (Terrebonne)
 Notre-Dame (Saint-Eustache)
 Notre-Dame-de-l'Assomption (Blainville)
 Plateau Saint-Louis (Blainville)
 Prés fleuris (Mirabel)
 Rose-des-Vents (Saint-Joseph-du-Lac)
 Sainte-Scholastique (Mirabel)
 Saint-Pierre (Sainte-Thérèse)
 Sauvé (Deux-Montagnes)
 Terre des jeunes (Saint-Eustache)
 Terre-Soleil (Sainte-Thérèse)
 Val-des-Ormes (Rosemère)
 Village-des-Jeunes (Saint-Eustache)

See also
 Sir Wilfrid Laurier School Board (area Anglophone school board)

References

External links
 Commission scolaire de la Seigneurie-des-Mille-Îles 

Historical school districts in Quebec
Education in Laurentides
Saint-Eustache, Quebec